Rear Admiral Neil Morisetti,  is a retired Royal Navy officer who is an Honorary Professor and Director of Strategy at University College London's Science, Technology, Engineering and Public Policy Department.

Naval career
Morisetti was educated at the City of London School, and subsequently joined the Royal Navy in 1976. After initial training at Britannia Royal Naval College in Dartmouth, he held shore postings and attended the University of East Anglia and graduated with a Bachelor of Science. In 1986 he was appointed commanding officer of the patrol boat  of the Northern Ireland Squadron.

Morisetti was later Principal Warfare Officer of the frigate , and in 1991 joined the Naval Secretary's Department as an officers' appointer in 1991. From 1993 to 1994 he was commanding officer of the destroyer .

After attending the Joint Service Defence College, Morisetti joined the Directorate of Navy Plans and Programmes in 1995. He was then Chief Staff Officer for Plans and Programmes to Flag Officer Surface Flotilla, before returning to command Cardiff as Captain 5th Destroyer Squadron in 1999.

Morisetti returned to the Ministry of Defence as deputy director of Resources and Plans, and was then appointed Director TOPMAST, the project developing a new Royal Navy manpower system, as a commodore. 

After attending the Higher Command and Staff Course in 2004, Morisetti took command of the aircraft carrier . Invincible acted as the flagship during the Trafalgar 200 naval review off Portsmouth in June 2005, before being paid off the following month. In November 2005 he was promoted to rear admiral and appointed Commander United Kingdom Maritime Forces (COMUKMARFOR), also serving as NATO High Readiness Force Maritime Commander. In July 2007 he was appointed Commandant of the Joint Services Command and Staff College. Morisetti was appointed a Companion of the Order of the Bath (CB) in the 2009 Birthday Honours, and the following November became the United Kingdom's Climate and Energy Security Envoy. In January 2013 he was appointed as the Foreign Secretary's interim Special Representative for Climate Change, a position he held for ten months.

Post-navy career
Following his retirement from the Royal Navy, Morisetti was appointed an Honorary Professor and Director of Strategy at University College London's Science, Technology, Engineering and Public Policy Department in January 2014.

Morisetti is a Freeman of the City of London.

Footnotes

|-

Living people
Alumni of the University of East Anglia
Companions of the Order of the Bath
Graduates of Britannia Royal Naval College
People educated at the City of London School
Royal Navy rear admirals
English people of Italian descent
Year of birth missing (living people)